Silvertown railway station was on the North London Line (NLL) serving the Silvertown area of east London, the station and the eastern section of the line it was on were closed in 2006.

History
Silvertown was opened in 1863 by the Great Eastern Railway, on the route of the former Eastern Counties and Thames Junction Railway, with two tracks and platforms. A decline in use of the line led to the removal of one of the two tracks in 1980, leaving just one platform to serve trains in both directions. North Woolwich was also reduced to one platform. After third rail electrification of the line in 1986 by British Rail, services were increased and the single-track section became a bottleneck. Prior to closure, the typical Monday to Saturday service frequency westbound towards  and eastbound towards North Woolwich was one train every 30 minutes during the daytime, increasing to one every 20 minutes in the evening; one train called every 30 minutes all day on Sundays.

In 1973 a government report on the redevelopment of London's Docklands proposed an extension of the unbuilt Fleet line from Charing Cross via Fenchurch Street to Woolwich Arsenal, with stations on each side at Custom House and Woolwich Arsenal. The proposal was developed during the 1970s as the Fleet line developed into the Jubilee line. Although approved in 1980, financial constraints meant that the route was not proceeded with. By the start of the 1990s new plans had been developed to extend the Jubilee line on a route south of the River Thames towards Stratford.

After London City Airport opened nearby there was an attempt to offer the station for connection to the airport, the station being renamed Silvertown and London City Airport on 4 October 1987, but the walk through adjacent side streets, and the relatively infrequent service, which was peripheral rather than into central London, led to little usage of the airport interchange.

The Docklands Light Railway Woolwich Arsenal branch now provides a substitute service for much of this part of the NLL; the nearest DLR station to the disused Silvertown station is London City Airport.

The remaining station buildings and platforms were demolished in 2012 as part of the construction of Crossrail, by Vinci, the contractor responsible for the reconditioning of the Connaught tunnel. Despite talk of constructing a replacement station nearby, this has not been provided for in the Crossrail Act 2008. Nevertheless, passive provision will be made for a station shortly to the east in the event of development of nearby properties.

Currently, there are proposals from London City Airport to fund the construction of a £50 million Crossrail station so as to serve London City Airport. However, Transport for London require a formal feasibility study from City Airport to be completed. This is so that progress of the Crossrail project would not be affected by station's construction.

Gallery

References

External links
Disused stations in the UK - Silvertown

Disused railway stations in the London Borough of Newham
Former Great Eastern Railway stations
Railway stations in Great Britain opened in 1863
Railway stations in Great Britain closed in 2006
1863 establishments in England
2006 disestablishments in England
Unbuilt London Underground stations
Proposed London Underground stations
Silvertown
Demolished buildings and structures in London
Buildings and structures demolished in 2012